Leposternon microcephalum, also known commonly as the smallhead worm lizard, is a species of amphisbaenian in the family Amphisbaenidae in the reptilian order Squamata. The species is endemic to South America.

Geographic range
L. microcephalum is found in southern Brazil, Bolivia, Paraguay, Uruguay, and northern Argentina. It occurs in the Itatiaia National Park between Rio de Janeiro and Minas Gerais in Brazil.

Ecology
Amphisbaenians have few predators due to their fossorial habits, powerful bite, and defensive tactics. However, some snakes have been found feeding on amphisbaenians including L. microcephalum.

Reproduction
L. microcephalum is oviparous.

References

Further reading
Boulenger GA (1885). Catalogue of the Lizards in The British Museum (Natural History). Second Edition. Volume II. ... Amphisbænidæ. London: Trustees of the British Museum (Natural History). (Taylor and Francis, printers). xiii + 497 pp. + Plates I-XXIV. (Lepidosternon microcephalum, p. 462).
Cacciali P, Scott NJ, Ortíz ALA, Fitzgerald LA, Smith P (2016). "The Reptiles of Paraguay: Literature, Distribution, and an Annotated Taxonomic Checklist". Museum of Southwestern Biology, University of New Mexico, Special Publication (11): 1–373.
Gans C (1971). "Studies on Amphisbaenians (Amphisbaenia, Reptilia). 4. A review of the amphisbaenid genus Leposternon ". Bulletin of the American Museum of Natural History 144 (6): 379–464. (Leposternon microcephalum, pp. 415–435, 451–456, Figures 24–44, 53–55).
Wagler J (1824). In: Spix J (1824). Serpentum Brasiliensum species novae ou histoire naturelle des espèces nouvelles de serpens, recueillies et observées pendant le voyage dans l'intérieur du Brésil dans les années 1817, 1818, 1819, 1820 exécuté par ordre de sa Majesté le Roi de Baviére. Munich: F.S. Hübschmann. viii + 75 pp. + Plates I-XXVI. (Leposternon microcephalus, new species, pp. 70–71 + Plate XXVI, figures 2–3). (in Latin and French).

microcephalum
Reptiles of Argentina
Reptiles of Bolivia
Reptiles of Brazil
Reptiles of Paraguay
Reptiles of Uruguay
Taxa named by Johann Georg Wagler
Reptiles described in 1824